Koda River may be:
Koda River, the Japanese name of the Hutuo River (China) in the Linji school of Buddhism
Koda River (D. R. Congo), also spelled Kodda or Kodha, in Ituri province
Kōda River (Aichi), Japan; also called Kōta like the town
Kōda River (Kōchi), Japan 
Koda River (Russia), a tributary of the Angara, NE of Kodinsk
Koda River (South Sudan), in Jubek State

See also
Koda (disambiguation)